Cavallino Matto is the largest amusement park in Tuscany. The park, the name of which means "Little Crazy Horse" in Italian, is located on 60,000 square metres of pine forest in Marina di Castagneto Carducci, Province of Livorno, and includes rides and dining facilities.

History
The park began as a free playground in 1967.  Called "Parco Gulliver" (Gulliver Park), it was expanded in the 1990s with amusement park rides and renamed. Additional rides were added in 2001. In February 2006, the Manfredi family bought the park and renovated it with a number of new attractions, including live shows.

Rides
The park currently operates five roller coasters, "Freestyle", "Project 1", "Speedy Gonzales", "Topozorro" and "Wild Mine". Other attractions include the Baia dei Bucanieri, a ride that opened in 2007 that features water cannons for the passengers, and "Safari Adventure", a safari ride featuring animatronic animals. Shows include the 3D cinema "Movie Stars Theatre" as well as live performances by acrobats and orchestras.

External links
 Official website

Amusement parks in Italy
1967 establishments in Italy
Amusement parks opened in 1967